The 2005 Conference USA men's basketball tournament was held March 9–12 at the FedExForum in Memphis, Tennessee.

Top-seeded Louisville defeated hosts  in the championship game, 75–74, to clinch their second Conference USA men's tournament championship. It was the Cardinals' second title in three years.

The Cardinals, in turn, received an automatic bid to the 2005 NCAA tournament. They were joined in the tournament by fellow C-USA members UAB, Charlotte, and Cincinnati, all of whom earned at-large bids. Louisville would ultimately advance to the Final Four.

Format
There were no changes to the tournament format from the previous year. 

The top four teams were given byes into the quarterfinal round while the next eight teams were placed into the first round. The two teams with the worst conference records were not invited to the tournament. All remaining tournament seeds were determined by regular season conference records.

Bracket

References

Conference USA men's basketball tournament
Tournament
Conference USA men's basketball tournament
Conference USA men's basketball tournament